Véronique Pecqueux-Rolland (born 9 October 1972 in Voiron, Isère) is a French former handballer who played for the French national team. She received a gold medal at the 2003 World Championship and a silver medal at the 1999 World Championship. She won the Cup Winners' Cup with ES Besançon in 2003.

Pecqueux-Rolland made her debut with the national team on 12 March 1993. She stopped playing for France after the 2008 Summer Olympics, having scored 898 goals in 302 matches. She retired from handball in April 2009.

Results 
Club
 French Championship: Winner in 1998 and 2003; Runner-up in 2005
 French Cup: Winner in 2003 and 2005; Finalist in 2006 and 2007
 French League Cup: Winner in 2003 and 2004; Finalist in 2006 and 2007
 Cup Winners' Cup: Winner in 2003

National team
 World Championship: Gold in 2003; Silver in 1999
 European Championship: Bronze in 2002 and 2006

Awards 
Pivot of the All-Star Team at the 2000 and 2004 Summer Olympics.

References

External links 
 Official site

1972 births
Living people
People from Voiron
French female handball players
Handball players at the 2000 Summer Olympics
Handball players at the 2004 Summer Olympics
Handball players at the 2008 Summer Olympics
Olympic handball players of France
Sportspeople from Isère